"Rhythm of the Night" is a song by American musical recording group DeBarge, written by Diane Warren and released on February 23, 1985, on the Motown label as the first single from their fourth studio album Rhythm of the Night (1985). The song jump-started the career of the prolific songwriter Warren, and was the biggest hit recorded by the Motown family singing group, peaking at number three on the Billboard Hot 100.

Overview

History
By 1985, DeBarge had become pop/R&B sensations, with ballads mostly making up the repertoire of their hit catalog, though they were as impressive as live performers, with their mixture of their trademark soft ballads and a collection of dance material. Motown Records sought to produce DeBarge with a dance single, hoping to give them a bigger crossover success, mirroring that of label-mate Lionel Richie, who like DeBarge, had created his initial fan base on soft songs before the release of "All Night Long", which included a catchy dance beat influenced by calypso. A similar influence would come in the production of "Rhythm of the Night", which featured more of El DeBarge's modal tenor voice with flashes of his trademark falsetto. Richard Perry, the hit producer behind hit recordings for The Pointer Sisters, Harry Nilsson, and Carly Simon, among others, was appointed to produce the single with Diane Warren as its writer.

Reception
The release of "Rhythm of the Night" coincided with the release of the Motown film The Last Dragon, which featured the song as part of its soundtrack. The free publicity from the song's association with the movie helped boost its popularity. Eventually released as a single, the song produced DeBarge's biggest success yet, with the single reaching number three on the Billboard Hot 100, number one on the Hot R&B/Hip-Hop Songs chart, number one on the US adult contemporary chart, and number four in the UK singles chart - their only major hit single in the UK - going gold and boosting similar success for its parent album of the same name. The group's music video of the song gained the group heavy rotation on MTV and BET and was actually the group's first (and last) real music video, starting a brief period where DeBarge became pop superstars. More recently, the song featured in the 2016 film Ghostbusters: Answer the Call. The song also features heavily in the twelfth season of RuPaul's Drag Race as a running gag, due to contestant Crystal Methyd's out-of-drag resemblance to El DeBarge. Lyrics and sample from the chorus of "Rhythm of the Night" were adopted in CNCO's song "Pretend".

Charts

Weekly charts

Year-end charts

Certifications

Personnel 

Musicians
 El DeBarge – lead vocals 
 DeBarge – backing vocals, spoken monologues
 Jeff Lorber – Yamaha DX7
 Steve Mitchell – additional synthesizers 
 Howie Rice – additional synthesizers
 Dann Huff – guitars 
 Paul Jackson Jr. – guitars 
 Abraham Laboriel – bass
 John Robinson – Oberheim DMX
 Paulinho da Costa – percussion

Production
 Richard Perry – producer 
 Bradford Rosenberger – production coordinator 
 Don Smith – rhythm track recording, vocal track recording 
 Michael Brooks – overdub engineer 
 Barney Perkins – remixing 
 Glen Holguin – assistant engineer 
 Alex Schmoll – assistant engineer
 Jim Scott – assistant engineer
 Diane Warren – songwriter

Official Versions

Album Version - 3:52

Long Version - 6:43

Dance Mix - 5:45

See also
List of number-one R&B singles of 1985 (U.S.)
List of number-one adult contemporary singles of 1985 (U.S.)

References

1985 singles
1985 songs
DeBarge songs
Songs written by Diane Warren
Song recordings produced by Richard Perry
Motown singles
Dance-pop songs